Khel Khilari Ka is a 1977 Bollywood action film directed by Arjun Hingorani.

The songs on the film's soundtrack record were composed by Kalyanji–Anandji, written by Rajinder Krishan, and performed by Kishore Kumar, Lata Mangeshkar, Manna Dey, Asha Bhosle and Mukesh.

Cast
Dharmendra ...  Ajit 
Shabana Azmi ...  Rachna 
Dhruv   
Dev Kumar...  Sangram Singh 
Narendra Nath ...  Sangram Singh's Son (as Narendranath) 
Mehmood Jr. ...  Rahim 
Shakti Kapoor...( As Sunil Kapoor )
Komilla Wirk  (as Komila Wirk) 
Ravi   
Johnny Walker ...  Khairatilal (as Johny Walker) 
Sujata Bakshi  (as Sujata) 
Bharat Bhushan ...  Masterji (as Bharat Bhooshan) 
Shyama ...  Mrs. Khairatilal 
Hiralal ...  Murli 
Jankidas ...  Jankidas Karodimal

Songs
"Pyar Kaa Bandhan, Khun Kaa Rishta" - Mukesh, Lata Mangeshkar
"Ye Na Jane" - Mukesh, Lata Mangeshkar
"Is Kismat Ke Kaise, Rang Niraley" (Part 1) - Lata Mangeshkar, Mukesh
"Ek Bablu Puchhe Babli Se, Kya Puchhe Pagla Pagli Se" - Kishore Kumar, Lata Mangeshkar
"Jaan Ab Ja Rahi Hai" - Asha Bhosle, Manna Dey
"Pyar Bada Hai Ya Jaan Badi Hai" - Lata Mangeshkar, Asha Bhosle
"Sabak Pada Hai Jab Se" - Kishore Kumar, Manna Dey, Asha Bhosle, Kanchan

References

External links
 

1977 films
1970s Hindi-language films
Films scored by Kalyanji Anandji